The following is a list of Italy women's national rugby union team international matches.

Full internationals

1980s

1990s

2000s

2010s

2020s

Other matches

References 

Italy women's national rugby union team
Women's rugby union in Italy